The DFV-Supercup (also known as Pokal des Deutschen Sportechos) was the super cup of East German football, played between the winners of the DDR-Oberliga and the FDGB-Pokal.

History
It was originally planned to start in 1988, but was postponed as BFC Dynamo had won both competitions. An edition was played in 1989, with the Cup Winners BFC Dynamo beating Dynamo Dresden 4–1.  The competition was not played in 1990 with German reunification underway, and an all-German Deutschland Cup was played instead. In 1991, the winners of the last East German titles, Hansa Rostock, along with cup finalists Stahl Eisenhüttenstadt, entered the DFB-Supercup.

Teams

1989 match

Details

Gallery

See also
List of East German football champions
FDGB-Pokal

References

External links
East Germany - List of Cup Finals, RSSSF.com

Defunct football cup competitions in Germany
Supercup
Germany, East
DFL-Supercup
1989–90 in German football cups
1989–90 in East German football
Berliner FC Dynamo matches
Dynamo Dresden matches
Sport in Cottbus
August 1989 sports events in Europe
20th century in Cottbus
Association football matches in East Germany